Larissa Joy Waters (born 8 February 1977) is an Australian politician. She is a member of the Australian Greens and has served as a Senator for Queensland since 2018. She previously served in the Senate from 2011 to 2017, resigning during the parliamentary eligibility crisis due to her holding Canadian citizenship in violation of Section 44 of the Constitution of Australia. Waters serves as her party's Senate leader, in office since February 2020. She previously served as co-deputy leader from May 2015 to July 2017 and again from December 2018 to June 2022.

Early life
Waters was born in Winnipeg, Manitoba, Canada, when her Australian parents were in Canada working and studying but left as an 11-month-old baby and grew up in Brisbane.

She has a Bachelor of Science and a Bachelor of Laws from Griffith University and a Graduate Diploma in Legal Practice from the New South Wales College of Law. From 2000 to 2001 she was a legal researcher at the Queensland Land and Resources Tribunal (predecessor of the Land Court of Queensland), from 2001 to 2002 a lawyer at Freehills, and from 2002 to 2011 was a lawyer with the Environmental Defenders Office.

Political career 
Waters was the Greens' Brisbane Central Candidate in the 2006 Queensland state election running against then Premier Peter Beattie, securing almost 5,000 votes.  Waters was the lead Senate candidate for the Greens in Queensland at the 2007 federal election. The party received 7.3 percent of the statewide vote (an increase of 1.9 points), but this was not enough to secure her election. Waters again stood for office at the 2009 Queensland state election, running for the seat of Mount Coot-tha. The seat was held by the sitting Treasurer of Queensland, Andrew Fraser of the Labor Party. She polled 23.1 percent on first preferences, with Ronan Lee (25.9 percent in Indooroopilly) the only Greens candidate with a higher percentage.

Waters was again placed first on the Greens' senate ticket at the 2010 federal election. She was elected with 12.8 per cent of the vote, an increase of 5.4 percentage points. In May 2015, Waters was elected to the Greens' "leadership triumvirate". She was made a "co-deputy leader" alongside Scott Ludlam, with Richard Di Natale replacing Christine Milne as the party leader. Waters was re-elected to the senate at the 2016 double-dissolution election, winning a three-year term with 6.9 percent of the vote.

Resignation 

Waters was forced to resign from the Senate on 18 July 2017, after it was uncovered that she was a dual Canadian-Australian citizen, thereby making her ineligible to be elected under section 44 of the Australian Constitution. Her resignation came four days after her fellow Greens co-deputy leader Scott Ludlam had resigned from the Senate over dual citizenship, which prompted several other MPs and Senators to clarify their citizenship status.

Waters had been born to Australian parents in Canada, and returned with them to Australia as a baby. She stated that she had previously believed she was solely an Australian citizen, and if she had wished to gain Canadian citizenship she would have needed to take active steps before age 21—but now discovered she had in fact held dual citizenship since birth.

Her seat was filled by a recount, which saw former Australian Democrats leader Andrew Bartlett, who held the second position after Waters on the Greens' 2016 Senate ticket in Queensland, return to the Senate.

On 8 August 2017, Waters announced that she had renounced her Canadian citizenship and declared her intent to stand for Greens preselection and return to parliament at the next federal election. The High Court handed down its decision on 27 October 2017 and ruled that Waters was invalidly elected.

Return
On 3 April 2018, Waters was announced as the Queensland Greens lead Senate candidate for the next federal election, with Andrew Bartlett instead opting to contest the lower house seat of Brisbane. On 16 June 2018, Bartlett announced that he would resign from the senate at the end of August, and Waters was preselected to fill the resulting casual vacancy ahead of the election. On 6 September 2018, the Parliament of Queensland re-appointed Waters to the Senate. The Greens party room returned Waters to the co-deputy leadership on 4 December 2018.

Waters was re-elected as a Senator for Queensland at the 2019 federal election, where she received 9.9% of the state's vote, as well as a 3.12-point swing in her favour.

In February 2020, Greens leader Senator Di Natale resigned and was succeeded by Adam Bandt.

Unlike his predecessors as Greens leader including Di Natale, Bandt is a member of the House of Representatives and this resulted in Senator Waters as one of the co-deputy leaders becoming the leader of the Greens in the Senate.

Although not the leader of the Greens overall, the appointment of Senator Waters as leader in the Senate makes her the second woman to lead the Greens in the Senate after Christine Milne.

In March 2021, Larissa Waters issued an apology to Federal Minister Peter Dutton for comments made on Twitter accusing him of being an "inhuman, sexist rape apologist". Larissa Waters stated in her apology "I accept that there was no basis for those allegations and that they were false. I unreservedly apologise to Minister Dutton for the hurt, distress and damage to his reputation I have caused him."

Portfolio positions 
Whilst serving as Co-Deputy Leader of the Greens alongside Senator Nick McKim and Leader of the Greens in the Senate, Waters also represents the party in the following issues:

 Women
 Mining & Resources
 Democracy

Personal life
Waters was married to journalist Brendan O'Malley and they have one child together born in 2009. Waters and O'Malley separated in 2013 and share care of their daughter. Waters has another child born in 2016 to former partner Jeremy Gates.

References

External links 
 
 
 Summary of parliamentary voting for Senator Larissa Waters on TheyVoteForYou.org.au

1977 births
Living people
Australian Greens members of the Parliament of Australia
Australian LGBT rights activists
Members of the Australian Senate
Members of the Australian Senate for Queensland
Women members of the Australian Senate
21st-century Australian lawyers
Canadian emigrants to Australia
Naturalised citizens of Australia
People from Queensland
Politicians from Winnipeg
Griffith University alumni
Australian women lawyers
21st-century Australian politicians
21st-century Australian women politicians